Certaldo is a town and comune of Tuscany, Italy, in the Metropolitan City of Florence, in the middle of Valdelsa.

It is 50 minutes by rail and 35 minutes by car southwest of Florence, and it is 40 minutes by rail north of Siena.

It was home to the family of Giovanni Boccaccio, author of the Decameron, who died at his home in Certaldo and was buried there in 1375. The actor Ernesto Calindri was born in Certaldo.

Geography 
The town of Certaldo is divided into upper and lower parts. The lower part is called Certaldo Basso, whilst the medieval upper part is called Certaldo Alto. Certaldo Alto has limited vehicular access, for use by residents only. Visitors can park outside the walls or in the lower part and go to Certaldo Alto by the Certaldo funicular.

History

Etruscan-Roman period 
Certaldo had Etruscan-Roman origins, as shown by the numerous archaeological finds that are scattered around the city's territory, including ceramics, utensils and Etruscan tombs, some of which were found just recently. The Etruscan origins were discovered mostly thanks to the toponymy of some localities and streams, for example the Agliena and the Elsa river (which flow near Certaldo), and the foodstuffs deposits in the hills. There are two hills in Certaldo where Etruscan tombs have been found, Poggio del Boccaccio and Poggio alle Fate. There was also a necropolis. All of the finds of Etruscan-Roman origin are today kept in the ground floor of the Palazzo Pretorio, in the medieval part of the town.

Boccaccio's house, of red brick, like the other old houses here, was restored in 1823 and furnished with old furniture. A statue of him was erected in the main square in 1875.
The Palazzo Pretorio, or Vicariale, the residence of the Florentine governors, recently restored to its original condition, has a picturesque facade adorned with ceramic coats of arms, and in the interior are various frescoes dating from the 13th to the 16th century.

Culture 
The town hosts several festivals a year. The largest and most famous is Mercantia, a week-long party in Certaldo Alto. It involves numerous street performers from across Italy, Europe and the Americas.

Twin towns 
 Neuruppin, Germany
 Kanramachi, Japan
 Canterbury, United Kingdom

References 

Cities and towns in Tuscany